Martin Willoughby Parr CBE (22 November 1892 – 15 June 1985), CBE (1944, OBE 1929), was a governor of the British-administered province of Equatoria in Anglo-Egyptian Sudan.

Early life
Martin Parr was the son of the Rev. Willoughby Chase Parr and Laura, daughter of Colonel Francklyn of Speen Hill Lodge, Newbury.  His maternal grandmother was Jane Francklyn, daughter of Sir Samuel Cunard, baronet.  His brother Jack was a master at Winchester College. He was educated at Winchester College (Scholar) and Brasenose College, Oxford (Scholar) where he read Greats.  He played Rugby football for Oxford University 1913–14, and had a half-blue for rifle shooting, 1913–14.

Career
Parr was commissioned in the Highland Light Infantry at the start of the World War I in 1914 and served in France 1914–15 and in Palestine 1917–18, returning to France in 1918.  He lost an eye during the Battle of Neuve Chapelle.

In 1919 Parr joined the Sudan Political Service  and became Private Secretary to the Governor-General, 1927–33 and Deputy Civil Secretary, 1933–34. He was Governor of the Upper Nile, 1934–36; and Governor of Equatoria, 1936-42.  He retired from the Sudan in 1942 and lived the rest of his life in London.

Later life
Parr was Vice-President of the National Association of Boys Clubs, working particularly with the Crown & Manor boys' club in Hoxton.  His obituary in The Times mentions "an early tendency to compare the Hoxton boys with his beloved Dinka tribesmen, initially somewhat to the disadvantage of the former".  He was also on the Foundation Committee of the Gordon Boys' School, Woking (now called Gordon's School).

He was a prominent member of the congregation of the Temple Church, Vice President of the British and Foreign Bible Society, and Vice President of the Church Missionary Society. He was an Alderman of the London County Council (Conservative) 1954-61. He died unmarried.

References
Obituary in The Times 28 June 1985
Empire on the Nile:  The Anglo-Egyptian Sudan, 1898-1934 M W Daly, Cambridge University Press (2004)
Shadows in the Grass: Britain in the Southern Sudan, 1918-1956, Yale University Press (1983)
Catalogue of papers of M W Parr deposited at Durham University

Notes

1892 births
1985 deaths
British Army personnel of World War I
Commanders of the Order of the British Empire
Highland Light Infantry officers
Members of London County Council
Sudan Political Service officers
British people in the Anglo-Egyptian Sudan